Charles Rollin Buckalew (December 28, 1821May 19, 1899) was an American lawyer, diplomat, and Democratic Party politician from Pennsylvania. He represented the state for one term in the United States Senate, where he was an advocate for proportional representation and cumulative voting, from 1863 to 1869.

Buckalew also served three nonconsecutive terms in the Pennsylvania Senate (1851–1854, 1859–1860, and 1869–1870) and two consecutive terms in the U.S. House of Representatives from 1887 to 1891. He served as Minister Resident for Ecuador under President James Buchanan from 1858 to 1861.

Early life and education
Buckalew was born in Fishing Creek Township, Pennsylvania on December 28, 1821 to John McKinney Sr. and Martha Funston Buckalew.  He was a graduate of Harford Academy, Susquehanna County, Pennsylvania, where he studied law. He was admitted to the bar in 1843.

Career
Buckalew was the most influential early advocate of proportional representation in the United States.  His proposals for a type of voting system known as cumulative voting gained significant support in Congress, and he played a central role in the adoption of cumulative voting in several places, including Illinois for state legislative elections in 1870, a system that lasted in that state until 1980.

Buckalew was elected by the Pennsylvania General Assembly to the U.S. Senate in 1863. In a number of speeches, notably in the Senate on July 11, 1867; at a large public meeting in Philadelphia in November of the same year; before the Social Science Association at Philadelphia in October 1870; and in the Senate of Pennsylvania on March 27, 1871; as well as in the report of the Select Committee on Representative Reform of the United States Senate, of which be was chairman, Buckalew argued persuasively for the use of cumulative voting in the election of representatives in Congress, state legislatures, town councils and other bodies.

Buckalew's bill in the Senate would have allowed all the electors of a state to have the number of votes equal to the number of house of representatives members to be elected from that state.  The voter could give all his votes to one candidate, or distribute them in any fashion, equally or unequally, among candidates.  The candidates with the highest number of votes would be elected.

In addition to serving in Congress and the Pennsylvania state legislature, Buckalew was commissioner to exchange ratifications of a treaty with Paraguay in 1854; chairman of the Democratic State committee in 1857; appointed one of the commissioners to revise the penal code of Pennsylvania in 1857; Minister Resident to the Republic of Ecuador 1858-1861; unsuccessful candidate for governor of Pennsylvania in 1872; and a delegate to the Pennsylvania constitutional convention of 1873.

He resumed the practice of law when he left Congress in 1891, age 69, in Bloomsburg, Columbia County, where he died on May 19, 1899.  He is interred in Rosemont Cemetery in Bloomsburg.

Buckalew's writings and speeches on cumulative voting were collected in an 1872 book titled Proportional Representation. 1872, Philadelphia, J. Campbell & Son.

References and notes

External links

 Retrieved on 2009-04-01

Proportional Representation, by Charles R. Buckalew at the University of Michigan Making of America online library
 

|-

1821 births
1899 deaths
19th-century American diplomats
19th-century American politicians
Ambassadors of the United States to Ecuador
Burials in Pennsylvania
Democratic Party United States senators from Pennsylvania
Pennsylvania lawyers
Democratic Party members of the United States House of Representatives from Pennsylvania
Democratic Party Pennsylvania state senators
People from Columbia County, Pennsylvania
People of Pennsylvania in the American Civil War
Writers from Pennsylvania
19th-century American lawyers